Izala Society or Jama'atu Izalatil Bid’ah Wa Iqamatus Sunnah (Society of Removal of Innovation and Re-establishment of the Sunnah), also called JIBWIS, is a Salafi movement originally established in Northern Nigeria to fight what it sees as the bid'ah (innovation) practiced by the Sufi brotherhoods. It is one of the largest Sunni societies in Nigeria, Chad, Ghana, Niger, and Cameroon.

Organization
Jibwis was established in 1978 in Jos, Nigeria by Sheikh Ismaila Idris (1930-2000) "in reaction to the Sufi brotherhoods", specifically the Qadiriyya and Tijjaniyya who practice Sufism.
According to Ramzi Amara, Today JIBWIS is one of the largest Salafi societies not only in Northern Nigeria, but also in the South and even in the neighboring countries (Chad, Niger, and Cameroon). It is very active in Da‘wa (propagation of the faith) and especially in education. The Izala has many institutions all over the country and is influential at the local, state, and even federal levels.

The group has been called a salafist organisation "that embraces a legalist and scripture centered upon understanding of Islam".
David Commins has described it as the fruit of missionary work by the Saudi Arabian funded and led by the World Muslim League.
"Essential texts" for members of the JIBWIS are "Muhammad ibn Abd al-Wahhab's treatise of God's unity and commentaries by his grandsons". Ibn Abd al-Wahhab was the founder of the Wahhabi mission, the official Islamic interpretation of Saudi Arabia. He saw Sufism as rife with idolatry (shirk). The Izala Society has been considered the most nonviolent and most educated Islamist group, due to their disposition to work, contribution and sharing knowledge to humanity through Qur’an and Sunnah.

Prominent members 
 Sheikh Abdullahi Bala Lau
Sheikh Abubakar Gumi (1924-1992)
Sheikh Kabir Gombe
Sheikh Sani Yahaya Jingir
Sheikh Isah Ali Pantami
Dr Ahmad Abubakar Gumi
Sheikh Yakubu Musa Katsina
 Alaramma Ahmad Sulaiman
 Sheikh Aminu Ibrahim Daurawa
 Sheikh Bello Yabo
 Dr Sani Umar Rijiyar Lemu

See also
Islamic extremism in Northern Nigeria
Hausa Animism
Tijaniyyah

References

External links
Official website (not in English)

Islamic organizations based in Nigeria
Nigeria
Salafi groups
1978 establishments in Nigeria
Islamic organizations established in 1978